Broom bush may refer to:

 Broom (shrub), shrubs in the subfamily Faboideae
 Melaleuca uncinata, known as Broombush or broom bush